is a railway station in Yamaguchi, Yamaguchi Prefecture, Japan.

Lines
The station is served by the Yamaguchi Line.

Station layout
The station consists of a single side platform serving one track. The entrance to the station is located at the north end of the platform. A shelter and automatic ticket machine are also located there. The station is unattended.

Adjacent stations

History
The station opened on 2 November 1914.

External links
 Official website 

Railway stations in Yamaguchi Prefecture
Railway stations in Japan opened in 1914